Neon levis is a jumping spider with palearctic distribution, occurring in Southern and Western Europe, northern Africa and Xinjiang (China). Females reach a size of up to 3 mm, males up to 2.5 mm. They are of a light yellowish-brown color, the legs having a light-dark annulation. Adult animals can be found in Germany from March to July.

These spiders occur in sunny, dry locations with little vegetation. In Germany the species is considered endangered.

Name
The species name is derived from Latin laevis "smooth, light".

References

External links
 Diagnostic drawings, picture

Salticidae
Spiders of Europe
Palearctic spiders
Spiders described in 1871